P.I. Private Investigations (also known as Private Investigations) is a 1987 crime-thriller film  directed  by Nigel Dick and  starring Clayton Rohner, Ray Sharkey and Paul Le Mat.

Premise
A young architect finds himself being stalked by a gang of criminals who believe he knows something that could expose their activities.

Cast
Clayton Rohner as Joey Bradley 
Ray Sharkey as Ryan 
Paul Le Mat as Detective Wexler 
Talia Balsam as Jenny Fox
Phil Morris as Eddie Gordon
Martin Balsam as Cliff Dowling
 William Kerwin as Anthony
Anthony Zerbe as Charles Bradley, Joey's Father
Robert Ito as Kim
Vernon Wells as Detective North
Anthony Geary as Larry
 Justin Lord as Howard White
Richard Cummings Jr. as Hollister
 Desiree Boschetti as Denise
Andy Romano as Mr. Watson 
Sydney Walsh as Janet 
 Jon St. Elwood as Gil
Robert Torti as Burglar 
 Nigel Dick  as Photographer

References

External links

1987 films
1987 crime films
1987 directorial debut films
1980s crime thriller films
1980s English-language films
American crime thriller films
Films directed by Nigel Dick
Films with screenplays by John Dahl
Metro-Goldwyn-Mayer films
PolyGram Filmed Entertainment films
1980s American films